In intentional camera movement (ICM), a camera is moved during the exposure for a creative or artistic effect. This causes the image points to move across the recording medium, producing an apparent streaking in the resulting image.

The process involves the selection of an aperture and the use of filters to achieve a suitable shutter speed. Proponents experiment both with the duration of the exposure and the direction and amount of camera movement while the shutter is open. Generally exposures of 1/20 to 1/2 second give the best results and an optimum seems to be 1/8 of a second to retain the shape of the subject, but strip away surface detail. The effect depends significantly on the direction that the camera is moved in relation to the subject as well as the speed of the movement. 

If light levels are high, the use of neutral density filters will reduce the light entering the lens, thus enabling the exposure to be extended. A polarising filter can also be fitted to the lens. This has a dual effect of reducing reflections within the image and reducing the light by about two stops. Photographers set the camera's ISO setting to the lowest available on the camera (commonly 100), as this reduces the camera's sensitivity to light and so gives the slowest possible shutter speed. 

The direction of movement of the lens has a dramatic effect on the results. Patience is required, along with much experimentation, to establish where and how to move the camera to achieve the desired effect. The camera can be moved upwards, downwards, to the right or left or away from or towards the subject while being handheld. The camera may also be turned, angled, and rapidly moved back and forth.

Leading proponents of the technique include Ernst Haas, Douglas Barkey, Alexey Titarenko and (from as early as 1962) Kōtarō Tanaka.
Rome: Renato Cerisola - 1953-2003 Eni's Way, 2003.Takahiro Kawamura, Giacomo Bucci in 1973 published some laws of motion blur programming.

Relation to motion blur

In a sense, ICM is the same effect as (intentional) single-exposition motion blur: in the former the camera moves during exposure, in the second the target moves, but they have in common that there is relative motion between camera and target, resulting in streaking in the image.

A special case occurs when the camera is moved during exposure while keeping it pointed at a moving target, to hold its projection on the recording medium steady. The stationary environment (usually mainly background, but possibly also some foreground) then is subjected to ICM and appears streaked in the final image.

Another special case is that of forward (or backwards) camera movement, typically with the camera focused on the distance. The streaks in the resulting image converge on the central point, giving a suggestion as if it is at the end of a long tunnel. A similar effect can be achieved by changing the focal length of a zoom lens during the exposure.

References

External links

Intentional Camera Movement Group at Flickr
http://kawamuratakahiro.com/

Photographic techniques